Malta is a village in Morgan County, Ohio, United States. The population was 671 at the 2010 census.

History
Malta was laid out in 1816.  The village was named after the European island of Malta.

Geography
Malta is located at  (39.650509, -81.864421). It is on the west side of the Muskingum River, opposite McConnelsville.

Demographics

2010 census
As of the census of 2010, there were 671 people, 278 households, and 174 families living in the village. The racial makeup of the village was 91.1% White, 4.0% African American, 0.1% from other races, and 4.8% from two or more races. Hispanic or Latino of any race were 0.3% of the population.

There were 278 households, of which 33.1% had children under the age of 18 living with them, 42.1% were married couples living together, 15.8% had a female householder with no husband present, 4.7% had a male householder with no wife present, and 37.4% were non-families. 30.9% of all households were made up of individuals, and 12.2% had someone living alone who was 65 years of age or older. The average household size was 2.41 and the average family size was 2.97.

The median age in the village was 36 years. 27.3% of residents were under the age of 18; 7.3% were between the ages of 18 and 24; 26% were from 25 to 44; 24.7% were from 45 to 64; and 14.8% were 65 years of age or older. The gender makeup of the village was 49.0% male and 51.0% female.

2000 census
As of the census of 2000, there were 696 people, 283 households, and 198 families living in the village. The population density was 2,241.1 people per square mile (866.9/km2). There were 318 housing units at an average density of 1,023.9 per square mile (396.1/km2). The racial makeup of the village was 90.80% White, 5.75% African American, 0.29% Asian, 0.29% from other races, and 2.87% from two or more races. Hispanic or Latino of any race were 0.14% of the population.

There were 283 households, out of which 34.3% had children under the age of 18 living with them, 43.8% were married couples living together, 22.6% had a female householder with no husband present, and 30.0% were non-families. 27.2% of all households were made up of individuals, and 14.1% had someone living alone who was 65 years of age or older. The average household size was 2.39 and the average family size was 2.85.

In the village, the population was spread out, with 27.7% under the age of 18, 7.9% from 18 to 24, 24.9% from 25 to 44, 23.3% from 45 to 64, and 16.2% who were 65 years of age or older. The median age was 39 years. For every 100 females there were 84.6 males. For every 100 females age 18 and over, there were 77.7 males.

The median income for a household in the village was $23,611, and the median income for a family was $27,083. Males had a median income of $28,125 versus $18,542 for females. The per capita income for the village was $10,703. About 23.3% of families and 25.3% of the population were below the poverty line, including 36.9% of those under age 18 and 13.3% of those age 65 or over.

Notable people

 Homer M. Carr - Minnesota state legislator
 Rufus R. Dawes - officer in the Union Army during the American Civil War who served in the Iron Brigade at the Battle of Gettysburg
 Sarah Jane Dawes Shedd - sister of Rufus R. Dawes, missionary in Persia
 W. Lee O'Daniel - Democratic former Governor from Texas
 Jeremiah McLain Rusk - former Governor of Wisconsin

References

External links
 Malta, Ohio

Villages in Morgan County, Ohio
Villages in Ohio
Muskingum River
1816 establishments in Ohio
Populated places established in 1816